= De Krant op Zondag =

Dutch Sunday newspaper

- Type: Weekly newspaper
- Format: Broadsheet
- Editor: René de Bok
- Founded: 14 October 1990
- Ceased publication: 10 May 1992
- Language: Dutch

De Krant op Zondag (The Newspaper on Sunday) was a Dutch Sunday newspaper which was launched on 14 October 1990.

On 10 May 1992 the final issue appeared. The editor-in-chief was René de Bok. De Krant op Zondag went into administration because of distribution problems and lack of advertisers. De Bok wrote a book about making the paper.
